The Metropolitanos of Havana was a baseball team in the Cuban National Series. The Metros, also known as the Guerreros (Warriors), had historically been a poor team, though they were ostensibly the heir to the Habana teams of the pre-revolutionary Cuban League.

Overview
It was one of two teams based in the city of Havana – the other being the more successful Industriales.
 
Frequently, the National Series removed several of the best players from the Metropolitanos squad and sent them to Industriales. Players including René Arocha, Osvaldo Fernández, Yasser Gomez, Enrique Diaz, Yadel Martí and Antonio Scull had begun their careers with the Guerreros, only to be sent later to the Leones.

The Metropolitanos ceased operations at the end of the 2011–12 Series Nacional.

Notable players
Infielders: Rey Vicente Anglada (second base), Enrique Díaz (second base), Rodolfo Puente (shortstop), Antonio Scull (first base), Rolando Verde (third base)
Outfielders: Armando Capiró, Jorge Salfrán, Oscar Valdés, Bombon Salazar, Julian Villar
Catcher: Iván Correa, Ernudis Poulot
Pitchers: José Modesto Darcourt, Rafael Gómez, Lázaro de la Torre, Ramón Villabrille

Also: Osvaldo Fernández Guerra, Eduardo Rodríguez

Emigrants
 René Arocha
 Osvaldo Fernández Guerra
 Alejandro Zuaznabar

References

External links

 Unofficial site

Baseball teams in Cuba
Baseball in Havana
Baseball teams established in 1974
1974 establishments in North America
Sports clubs disestablished in 2012
2012 disestablishments in North America